The 1895–96 Iowa Hawkeyes men's basketball team represented the University of Iowa in intercollegiate basketball during the 1895–96 season. The team finished the season with a 2–5 record. This squad is historically significant to the sport of college basketball: when they played the University of Chicago on January 18, 1896, the teams faced off with only five players to a side, establishing the first "modern" game of college basketball ever played. Chicago won the game, 15–12.

References

Iowa Hawkeyes men's basketball seasons
Iowa
Iowa Hawkeyes Men's Basketball Team
Iowa Hawkeyes Men's Basketball Team